Roger Oates Design is a British company that designs, manufactures and retails flooring, fabric and interior products.  The company is best known for Venetian Flatweave, a narrow width wool floorcovering usually fitted as a stair runner.

Company history 

Roger Oates, a graduate in Industrial Carpet Design met his wife Fay Morgan, a textile graduate, at the Royal College of Art. They began designing and working together and in 1977 founded the partnership Morgan & Oates designing rugs, throws and scarves for the interior design trade.

In 1989 Oates and Morgan founded Roger Oates Design Associates, the studio employed several handloom weavers and hand-tufters producing rugs and carpets.  In 1993 the company, now Roger Oates Design Co Ltd moved to "The Long Barn" on the Eastnor Castle Estate, near Ledbury, Herefordshire.  Previously derelict barns were converted to offices, design studios and workshops. The company's first retail showroom opened on this site in 1994.

In 1999 a showroom was opened in Chelsea, London and in 2007 French fabric house Pierre Frey became distributors in Europe.

In 2003 Roger Oates Design added a range of furnishing fabrics to its product line.

The company launched an online shop in 2014, selling a selection of home accessories including, furniture, cushions, bedlinen, throws and rugs. In 2015, in addition to the Roger Oates showrooms, products are sold by retailers and interior designers in the United Kingdom, Europe, Scandinavia, United States and Australia.

In 2016, Roger Oates Design was acquired by Ulster Carpets, in a deal advised by M&A Advisor BCMS.

Venetian flatweave 

Since 1993 Roger Oates has sold Venetian flatweave, designed and woven in the United Kingdom on specially adapted narrow width looms for floor runners. The heavy woven fabric is fitted onto staircases by trained fitters, and can be fitted around corners and on winding stairs.  The warp is always striped, and so the company produces a variety of stripe designs. A line of tartan fabrics has also been created.

In 2010 the company launched the Real Shetland Wool Flatweave Collection, made using British wool. The company became a supporter of The Prince of Wales' Campaign for Wool The company's wool carpets have been praised as eco-friendly because wool is biodegradable.

References

External links 

Textile manufacturers of England
British companies established in 1987
Manufacturing companies established in 1987